The following is a list of characters who first appeared in the Channel 4 soap opera Hollyoaks between 1995 and 1996, by order of first appearance. Hollyoaks is a long-running Channel 4 soap opera in the United Kingdom. 1995 was the first year for the soap and saw the introduction of several original characters. This period also saw the introduction of families such as the Cunningham family, the Osborne family, the Benson family and Andersen family.

Ollie Benson

Oliver "Ollie" Benson is a fictional character on the long-running Channel 4 British television soap opera Hollyoaks. He was played by actor Paul Leyshon between 1995-1997 and appeared from the first ever episode and left in 1997 when the character died in a road accident. Ollie was the youngest of Benson children and the brother of Kurt Benson and Lucy Benson.

Ollie worked as a roving journalist for the Riverbank Review, where he instigated such seminal reports as Babe of the Month and Cleavage of the Year. At home he loved to play practical jokes such as hiding the 'Unidentified Bleeping Object' in Kurt's room, where it proceeded to wake Kurt up at 6:59am every morning. Ollie's best mate was Lee "Stan" Stanley and even after Ollie exposed Stan's "Chips for Sex" scandal (in which he insinuated that Stan gave girls extra chips in order to seduce them) Ollie still remained the best of friends with Stan. At one time Ollie made a mistake of sleeping with Mandy Richardson, not discovering until later that she was only fifteen. He had a remarkably vibrant spirit and refused to let anything get him down even when he had to face the prospect of facing a charge for statutory rape for sleeping with Mandy. However, Ollie's life was to be short lived, as he was involved in a car accident after he tried to stop Stan in his car for driving too fast until Stan lost control of the car and a lorry reversed down the road where Stan had no time to brake. Ollie suffered some injuries and was rushed to hospital with his family beside him. After a week, both Ollie and Stan died in hospital.

Julie Matthews

Julie Matthews is a fictional character on the long-running Channel 4 British television soap opera Hollyoaks. She appeared in the very first episode of the series and left in 1997. She had two brief returns in 2002 and 2007 respectively. She was the girlfriend of Tony Hutchinson and was later engaged to him although she left him at the altar. When she returned in 2002 she was given a job at Gnosh Village by Tony and later become engaged to him. She later discovered Tony was also engaged to Izzy Davies. He tells her he wants to be with her but she reveals that she only wanted him so she could steal his money for her boyfriend who is in prison and leaves. Tony turns thirty and Jacqui plans to reward him with a stripper pole and sexy lingerie. Tina Reilly throws a surprise party and invites everyone in his address book. Tony is tipped off when old friend Jambo Bolton sends him a text saying he could not make it. Sending invites to everyone meant Tony's ex-fiancées, Julie, Izzy, and Tessie. Julie arrives and tries to make amends but Tony sends her away.

In 2018, Tony stayed at Julie's for two months while coming to terms with his daughter's illness.

Sarah Andersen

Sarah Andersen is a fictional character on the long-running Channel 4 British television soap opera Hollyoaks. She was introduced as part of the Andersen family and the sister of original character Natasha and was the daughter of Greg and Jane Andersen. In the first episode of the series, Sarah went with her friend Julie Matthews to Ollie Benson's house, and went joy riding in Ollie's brother Kurt's car and ended up going to hospital. Following her sister Natasha's death, Sarah went to live in the United States with her parents. In September 2013, it was revealed that Sarah and her sister Natasha were not real cousins with Darren.

Kurt Benson
 
Kurt Benson is a fictional character from the British Channel 4 soap opera Hollyoaks, played by Jeremy Edwards. He was one of seven original teen characters created for the show. He debuted on-screen during the episode airing on 23 October 1995 and was the first character seen on screen. He was created by Phil Redmond. He stayed on the show until he left in 1999 when he and girlfriend Ruth Osborne split up. The character was later killed off screen in a jet ski accident. It was revealed in 2020 that Kurt had faked his death and had been on the run for the past 20 years.

Natasha Andersen

Natasha Andersen is a fictional character from the British Channel 4 soap opera Hollyoaks, played by Shebah Ronay. She was one of seven original teen characters created for the show. She debuted on-screen during the first ever episode airing on 23 October 1995. She was created by Phil Redmond as one of the serial's original characters and stayed in the show until nearly six months later when she died on 11 March 1996. Her death was prompted after producers made the decision to have a hard hitting storyline due to criticism because of the lack of them. The storyline involved Natasha dying from the use of drugs.

Dawn Cunningham

Dawn Cunningham is a fictional character from the British Channel 4 soap opera Hollyoaks, played by Lisa Williamson. She was one of seven original teen characters created for the show. She appeared on the first episode on 23 October 1995, however she left in 1997 when the character died on Christmas Day due to her suffering from Leukemia. She is part of the long running Cunningham family which still currently plays a part in the show.

Angela Cunningham

Angela Cunningham (also Williams) is the ex-wife of Gordon Cunningham, and mother of Max Cunningham, Jude Cunningham, Cindy Cunningham and Dawn Cunningham. Since her first and last appearances as a regular character in 1995 and 1999, Angela has made several guest appearances in 2004, 2006 and 2008. She married her boyfriend, Terry Williams in the first ever marriage on the show.

When Hollyoaks began, Angela and Gordon were already divorced, but Angela tried to play a part in the complicated lives of Max, Jude, Cindy and Dawn, including Cindy's teenage pregnancy and Dawn's death from leukemia in 1997. Angela returned for Gordon's funeral in 2004, Max's wedding to Clare Devine in 2006, and again for his wedding to Steph Dean in 2008. When the ceremony finished, Gordon son Tom Cunningham was playing on the road when a car was coming, Max moved Tom on the pavement but he was struck by a car and was killed, and Angela's last appearance was attending Max's funeral.

She was mentioned in February 2010 when Cindy's daughter Holly Cunningham went missing, but she didn't return. In 2016, Cindy later called her, and was happy that Jude returned to the village.

Tony Hutchinson

Anthony "Tony" Hutchinson is a fictional character from the British Channel 4 soap opera Hollyoaks, played by Nick Pickard. He was one of seven original teen characters created for the show. Tony first appeared on-screen on 23 October 1995, the first episode of the series. The character was created by Phil Redmond as one of several main characters for the soap opera and since then has been part of various different storylines including an affair with Helen Cunningham (Kathryn George), the death of his daughter to sudden infant death syndrome and sleeping with underage Theresa McQueen (Jorgie Porter). Tony was the first character to speak on the series.

Terry Williams

Terry Williams is a fictional character on the long-running Channel 4 British television soap opera Hollyoaks. He was played by Ian Puleston-Davies and appeared in the first ever episode on 23 October 1995 before leaving in October 1996, a year after the character first appeared. He was the boyfriend of Angela Cunningham and when he married her he was part of the first ever marriage on the show. He had a continuous feud with Dawn and Jude Cunningham. He rented them his flat but later moved his brother in to annoy them. He later left leaving Angela in debts of over £55,000. In 2005, Max went to visit him for three days, he mentions this to his friend OB that Terry was doing well, and was still strong with his relationship with his mother. In 2008, he couldn't attend his stepson Max funeral. The Independent described him as the "toyboy" of Dawn's mother.

Jambo Bolton

James "Jambo" Bolton is a fictional character from the British Channel 4 soap opera Hollyoaks, played by Will Mellor. He was one of seven original teen characters created for the show. He first appeared in 1995 in the first ever episode airing 23 October 1995, before leaving in 1998. In 2004, Mellor reprised his role briefly for a special Christmas episode.

Lucy Benson

Lucy Benson is a fictional character from the long-running Channel 4 soap opera Hollyoaks, played by Kerrie Taylor between 1995–2000 and appeared in the shows first ever episode airing on 23 October 1995. The character left five years later when she went travelling.

Greg Andersen

Greg Andersen is a fictional character on the long-running Channel 4 British television soap opera Hollyoaks. He was introduced as part of the Andersen family and the father of original character Natasha, the husband of Jane Andersen, father of Sarah Andersen and brother of Celia Osborne. He first appeared in 1995 as the landlord of The Dog in the Pond and was the first landlord of the longstanding pub which currently survives today and has been the centre of many storylines. After Natasha died he sold the pub to Celia and her husband Jack Osborne and went back to the United States with Jane and Sarah. In 2005, Jack invited him, Jane and Sarah to his wedding with Frankie, however he and Jane couldn't attend due to flight comments, while Sarah had work conflicts.

In 2013, it was revealed that Greg was not Darren's uncle. In 2016, Jack's son Darren Osborne and his wife Nancy Osborne went to visit him, Jane and Sarah for a while.

Bazz

Bazil "Bazz" McCourtey is a fictional character from the long-running Channel 4 soap opera Hollyoaks, played by Toby Sawyer. He first appeared in the first episode of the series, airing on 23 October 1995 before leaving 3 years later. He was the friend of Tony Hutchinson, Jambo Bolton and Kurt Benson. He was a DJ and a musician who was part of the band the Crazy Bazz Studs with Lucy Benson and Carol Groves. He was also part of a band with Kurt, Jambo and Tony and tried to get his song played while at clubs in Ibiza while on holiday. He briefly dated Lucy but later came out as gay. The Chester Chronicle described him as "fun-loving", "quirky" and "party guy DJ Bazz" and who "turned up in his van". The Daily Record described him as "awful" and said after his exit that they thought it "was safe to turn my TV set on again".

Louise Taylor

Louise Taylor is a fictional character from the Channel 4 soap opera Hollyoaks, a long-running serial drama about life in a fictional suburb of Chester. She was played by Brett O’Brien between 1995 and 1996 and appeared in the very first episode on 23 October 1995. She was one of seven original teen characters created for the show by Phil Redmond.

She is first introduced as the best friend of Maddie Parker, Natasha Andersen and Dawn Cunningham. Louise had trouble with her boyfriend Joe who was rough with her and at her party she caught him with another woman and used a Ouiji board to get over Joe and she grows close to Kurt Benson whom she later starts a relationship with. Their relationship becomes troubled and they later split up after she doesn't want to have sex with him. She sets up the official Riverbank end of term revue and devises the routines with Dermot. She and Dermot begin a feud and he sets up his own Revue, to rival hers, taking some of her cast with him. After Dermot asks Natasha out on a date she tries to stop her going on the date with him. At Lucy Benson's eighteenth birthday party Natasha dies after having her drink spiked by Dermot and Rob Hawthorne. Louise finds it difficult to come to terms with Natasha's death and begins a friendship with traveller, Tree who she falls for before starting a relationship with him and deciding to leave Hollyoaks together for good. She has not been seen since she left in 1996.

Louise is described as a "hopeless romantic, causing her friends no end of trouble in her pursuit of the 'perfect' man. Louise was also obsessed with anything supernatural and lived her life according to what her horoscope dictated". The Liverpool Echo described Louise as "the most enigmatic of the debut seven. The character was a hopeless romantic in search of the perfect man who had a strong interest in the supernatural and lived her life by sticking to what the horoscopes said." They later described her as the "Gypsy-like earth mother Louise" and a "her own woman - a free spirit". She has also been described as "Responsible Lousie" who "was a bit of a stick in the mud". E4 as one of the "first generation of Hollyoaks starlets" adding that she is one of the "original Hollyoaks gang". They later described her time on the serial saying she "briefly dated Kurt Benson but ended their relationship when she didn’t want to sleep with him".

The Liverpool Echo described her as one of "the original magnificent seven". Lucy Ellman of The Independent described her storyline as "Natasha thought a friend who'd given herself to a two-timing louse (on the grounds that their star signs were compatible) was about to commit suicide. When she turned out to be alive, concern switched to the possibility that she might be pregnant". She responded negatively to the girls roles saying "The girls' role is highly suspect. They're given little to say, and spend their time worrying needlessly about each other". She added that "the girls entertain themselves with bodings of disaster" and that the "Women are there to perfume, tidy and present their cleavages". LastBroadcast described her exit saying "After Natasha's death, she left the village to run off with a new man". The Independent also labelled the original character's "mallrats" and added that Phil Redmond wrote the original cast as "glamorous young things who live in leafy suburbs rather than urban mean streets, and have only to worry about their spots and mobile phones".

Maddie Parker

Madeline "Maddie" Parker is a fictional character from the Channel 4 soap opera Hollyoaks, a long-running serial drama about life in a fictional suburb of Chester. She was one of seven original teen characters created for the show. She was played by actress Yasmin Bannerman between 1995 and 1997. Maddie was created by screenwriter Phil Redmond. She made her debut in the soap on 23 October 1995, and remained for one year and six months with Bannerman making her final appearance on 10 March 1997.

Juliette Benson

Juliette Benson was the mother of Kurt, Lucy and Ollie Benson, and wife of Kirk Benson. She left Hollyoaks with her husband, Kirk, after their children did not need them any more as Kurt and Lucy moved out.

Kirk Benson

Kirk Benson was the father of Kurt, Lucy and Ollie Benson, and husband of Juliette Benson. He owned his own computer business and left Hollyoaks with his wife Juliette, after their children did not need them any more, due to Kurt and Lucy moving out and Ollie's death.

Lewis Richardson

Lewis Richardson, played by Ben Hull. Lewis was introduced by Phil Redmond as part of the Richardson family. Lewis made his first on-screen appearance on 6 November 1995 before departing on 15 October 2001. Hull had heard of the serial and believed it had enormous potential, really wanted to be part of it. He described hearing of his casting as a "such a wonderful feeling". Hull quit the role in 2001. Hull said that he felt it was "time to do other things" adding that he was "very proud of Hollyoaks and what we've done with it". Hull added that "playing Lewis has been a wonderful experience. It's been hard work, but well worth it". Hull said that he quit because "I'd go home after filming and feel incredibly depressed, playing such a tormented and depressed character was exhausting". Hull admitted he had reservations after quitting the role and questioned if he had made the right decision. On his character's decision to commit suicide Ben Hull said "Lewis's greatest fear was that one day he would become like his father, alcoholic and abusive - and he has."

Max Cunningham

Max Cunningham is a fictional character from the British Channel 4 soap opera Hollyoaks, played by Matt Littler. From 1995 to 1997, Max was portrayed by Ben Sheriff before Littler took over. In 2008, Max, along with Tony Hutchinson (Nick Pickard), was the longest running character in Hollyoaks. In May 2008, it was announced that Littler had decided to leave the show and would depart in August 2008. The character died after finally marrying Steph Cunningham he was run over after pushing Tom Cunningham out of the way of a car.

Cindy Cunningham

Cynthia "Cindy" Cunningham (previously Hutchinson and Longford) is a fictional character from the British Channel 4 soap opera Hollyoaks, played by Stephanie Waring. She made her first on-screen appearance in December 1995, then played by Laura Crossley, as the youngest daughter of Gordon (Bernard Latham) and Angela Cunningham (Liz Stooke).

In 1996, Crossley quit the serial and the role was recast to actress Stephanie Waring. Waring remained with the soap until 2000, when she quit the role. Waring reprised the role briefly in 2002 and 2004 before returning to Hollyoaks as a full-time character in June 2008, reintroduced by series producer Bryan Kirkwood. In 2010, Waring became pregnant and her character was temporarily written out for Waring's maternity leave. Waring confirmed on her Twitter page at the beginning of December that she had received scripts for her return to the show. She returned to filming in January 2011 and returned on 9 March 2011.

Jane Andersen

Jane Andersen is a fictional character on the long-running Channel 4 British television soap opera Hollyoaks. She was introduced as part of the Andersen family and the mother of original character Natasha, the wife of Greg Andersen and mother of Sarah Andersen. She was the first Landlady of The Dog in the Pond which went on to be a centre focus for the show and still exists today. After Natasha died, Jane was distraught and at the end of 1996, Jane went back to the United States with Greg and Sarah.

Ruth Osborne

Ruth Osborne (previously Benson) is a fictional character from the long-running Channel 4 soap opera Hollyoaks, played by Terri Dwyer. She first appeared in January 1996 before leaving in 2001. Since then, she has made guest appearances between 2003-2004 and 2008. She was one of the first members of the Osborne family to play a part in Hollyoaks as they still currently do.

Carol Groves

Dermot Ashton

Dermot Ashton is a fictional character on the long-running Channel 4 British television soap opera Hollyoaks. He was played by actor Lauren Beales in 1996 and left when the character died in a car accident. Dermot was best friends with Rob Hawthorne and was generally known as Rob's spineless sidekick.

Dermot appeared as the friend of villain Rob Hawthorne in early 1996. He took Natasha Andersen to Lucy Benson's 18th birthday where he and Rob spiked Natasha's drink with a tablet in an attempt to rape her. This led to Natashas death and Rob felt guilty over what had happened. Later in the year, Dermot began having trouble with money so he asked Rob to help him. They decided to raid Dermot's dealers lockup and use the money to help Dermot with his financial trouble. They brought Lucy Benson and Carol Groves with them as alibis. While raiding the lockup, the dealer caught them in the act and a car chase ensued. Dermot tried to ditch the money out of the car window but Rob, who was driving, tried to stop him. Rob lost control of the car and they plunged into the River Dee. Rob, Lucy and Carol survived but Dermot was killed instantly.

Lee Stanley

Lee "Stan" Stanley was a cafeteria worker at Hollyoaks Community College, who befriended teenager Ollie Benson.

Stan appeared as the sidekick of Ollie Benson in 1996. Stan's life took a dramatic change when he found out that he was the father of Cindy Cunningham's child, Holly, after the pair had a one-night stand on her sixteenth birthday. Stan offered to stand by Cindy throughout the pregnancy but was cruelly rejected. Depressed, Stan began drinking heavily at The Dog. Ollie did his best to try to snap Stan out of his depression but it was no good, as Stan got in his car and started to drive at a dangerous speed. Ollie's warnings fell on deaf ears as the drunken Stan had careered into a reversing lorry, crashing and seriously injuring the pair. Both lay in a critical condition for a week in hospital, where they later died, leaving his girlfriend Cindy devastated, and becoming the single mother to Holly. The Daily Record commented on the character's death saying "When there's a problem with a character in Hollyoaks, they just kill them off."

Gordon Cunningham

Gordon Hilton Cunningham (commonly referred to as Mr. C) is a fictional character from the long-running Channel 4 soap opera Hollyoaks, played by Bernard Latham. He first appeared in March 1996, he left in 2004 when the character died of a heart attack which he had after being involved in a car crash. He briefly returned in 2008 in a dream sequence.

Rob Hawthorne

Jude Cunningham

Judith "Jude" Windsor-Davenport (also Cunningham) is played by Davinia Taylor. She joined the show as part of the Cunningham family. The Daily Record said she was a "Favourite" for being the "saucy Jude Cunningham, who had Lewis well and truly wrapped around her taloned finger". They added that she was "good old Jude" who caused "no end of trouble". Taylor was axed in October 1998 for timekeeping but alleged that she was to quit at the end of the year before being axed. On 26 May 2016, it was announced that Jude would be returning in the summer and she returned on 3 October 2016. Jude left the series again a month later on 3 November 2016.

Jude tried to blackmail Jack Osborne (Jimmy McKenna) about being the father of her sister Dawn's child, but instead she ended up getting drunk and telling everyone at The Dog public house. She led a colourful life, battling with drink and crippling debts. Jude seemed to be never short of luck, and yet something invariably seemed to go wrong with her fortune and life happily ever after. Jude began life in Hollyoaks studying fashion at Riverbank College but her academic life was short-lived, as she was thrown off her course for cheating. After this, she struggled to meet ends and, due to her irresponsible attitude towards money, was declared bankrupt and left with massive debts to clear. As Jude became increasingly desperate for money, she began working as an escort, but finally gave up after a few bad experiences with clients. Just as Jude began to get her life back together, tragedy struck when her sister Dawn (Lisa Williamson) died of leukaemia. Jude took the news badly, turning to drink to get her through the difficult times. The love of Jude's life was Lewis Richardson (Ben Hull), but he split up with her after he grew tired of her lies.

When her father Gordon's criminal cousin Benny arrived on the scene, Jude soon hooked up with him and started stealing cars to order. As she finally managed to pay off her debts, she bought Parker's and it seemed as if life was starting to get better for her. As always, this was short lived for Jude as she struggled to repay Benny what she owned him. Things turned nasty when Benny trashed Parker's and, to cover her losses, Jude began making illegal booze trips to France. However, this still did not bring enough money for the final instalment to buy her beloved Parker's. Desperate to make a success of her business, Jude agreed to do one last job for Benny. She had to pretend to get married so that Benny could snatch an expensive piece of jewellery stored at a stately home. Unsurprisingly, the plan went wrong and Jude was left as the number one suspect. She was days away from being arrested by the police and had to come up with a quick plan. A desperate Jude had no choice but to leave Hollyoaks. She brought a dark wig, took Dawn's passport, and bid farewell to her surviving sister, Cindy (Stephanie Waring) before leaving forever.

In 2002, Max, Gordon, Helen, Tom, Cindy, Holly, Angela and O.B. went to visit Jude for three days. In 2003, Max and Gordon went to visit her for four days, for her wedding to Damien Windsor. Jude is unable to attend her father's funeral in 2004 and Max's funeral in 2008 to avoid being arrested, although she had contacted Max to congratulate him for his wedding to Steph Dean (Carley Stenson), which occurred on the day of his death. In August 2013, Cindy mentions that her daughter Holly (Amanda Clapham) has gone to stay with Jude for a few days, but her current location is not revealed. In November 2013, Cindy mentions to Dirk Savage (David Kennedy) that how Jude was hidden in her location, since she was wanted in Hollyoaks to avoid going to prison. In 2016, Cindy went to visit Jude, after learning Alfie Nightingale (Richard Linnell) was the son she had given up for adoption years ago.

In October 2016, Jude returns under the name of "Mrs. Windsor Davenport", after having a meeting with Marnie Nightingale (Lysette Anthony) over the houses that she is building, called Royal Oakes. Jude is furious when Marnie insults Cindy and when Cindy arrives, she reveals herself as Cindy's sister, which backfires on Marnie. She later visits Cindy and is surprised that Cindy lives in a small flat. Whilst going around Hollyoaks with Cindy, she meets Tom who is angry that Jude hasn't called him leaving Jude upset. Whilst as The Dog in the Pond, she encounters Jack who she lashes out on for taking advantage of Dawn, as Jack will never forgive her for ruin his marriage with Celia. Cindy begs Jude to give her a discount for the flats that she is selling and Jude not wanting to sell the flat to Cindy refuses but later agrees. Cindy then signs and creates a petition to get Jude's building company sued and taken off, but then she calls it off so that she can get a discount off a house. The sisters then reconcile. Jude organizes the Hollyoaks "Halloween Spooktacular" in order to promote Royal Oakes; however, Cindy discovers that the whole project is a scam, and that Jude is intending to leave with a large bag of money, which she does.

Bethany Johnson

Bethany "Beth" Johnson (also Cunningham) is the illegitimate daughter of Dawn Cunningham and Jack Osborne. She was the result of an affair between Dawn and Jack, causing Jack's daughter Ruth Osborne to end her friendship with Dawn, however Dawn put Bethany up for adoption. In 1996, Bethany arrived in Hollyoaks when she needed a kidney transplant and Jack was the only option. Jack donated one of his kidneys after some hesitation. Dawn's sister Jude Cunningham tried to blackmail Jack about Bethany, but instead she ended up getting drunk and telling everyone at The Dog of Bethany. Jack tried to explain to his wife Celia Osborne, but she went back to America taking his son Darren Osborne with her. In 2004, Bethany came looking for Dawn and Jack before moving to Australia with her adoptive parents Dean and Jacqui and their son Noah, and before she leaves she meets Jack, Dawn's brother Max Cunningham, their sister Cindy Cunningham and her daughter Holly Cunningham and discovers that Dawn died of leukemia in 1997. Dawn's, Max's and Cindy's dad Gordon Cunningham was in a car crash in early 2004 in a car driven by his wife Helen Cunningham (Kathryn George) which led to their deaths and their son Tom Cunningham (Ellis Hollins) was left an orphan so he lived with Max.

In 2005, Jack sent an invitation for his wedding to Frankie Dean for Bethany, but found out that she's couldn't attend. He and Frankie went to see her at their honeymoon. In 2008, Jack send her wedding of her uncle Max to Steph, however couldn't attend the wedding and following Max's death after the wedding, she couldn't attend due to school exams.

Michael St John Thomas

Michael St John Thomas played by Tom Hudson, appears as an ex-boyfriend of Maddie Parker. Before he arrives Maddie is stalked including having flowers sprayed across her car although she fails to find the culprit. He arrives at Hollyoaks where they resume their relationship. She later ends their relationship due to his jealous behaviour and he becomes obsessive over her. He begins stalking her and obsesses over her becoming his wife. He kidnaps her and friend Jude Cunningham before driving to Scotland. She refuses and he takes Jude up onto the roof. He contemplates pushing her but is distracted when Maddie arrives dressed in the wedding dress he brought for her. Jude breaks free of his clutches and he falls to his death.

Celia Osborne

Celia Osborne (née Andersen) was the mother of Ruth Osborne and former wife of Jack Osborne. Celia arrived in Hollyoaks with Jack and his son Darren Osborne where they joined their daughter Ruth Osborne when Jack became the new landlord of The Dog in the Pond after Celia's brother Greg Andersen decided to sell the pub following the death of his daughter Natasha Andersen. After the revelation of Jack's affair and impregnation of Dawn Cunningham, Celia went back to the United States with Darren, leaving Jack running The Dog. They later divorced. Later Celia meets a man called Jerry and marries him. In September 2013, it is revealed that Celia is not Darren's mother and that Sandy Roscoe is his biological mother.

Jack Osborne
 
Jack William Osborne is a fictional character from the long-running Channel 4 soap opera Hollyoaks, played by James McKenna. He first appeared on 18 November 1996 and is the second longest serving character although Cindy Cunningham and Mandy Richardson both appeared before him both have taken considerable breaks before they returned full-time.

Darren Osborne

Darren Osborne is a fictional character from the British Channel 4 soap opera Hollyoaks, played by Ashley Taylor Dawson. He made his first on-screen appearance on 18 November 1996, then played by Adam Booth. Darren was introduced by executive producer Phil Redmond as part of the Osborne family and debuted amongst Jack Osborne and Celia Osborne, his parents. Adam Booth left the part in 1997, which was then recast with Dawson taking over the part in 1999. Dawson remained with the show until 2000 and returned full-time to the part in 2003.

He was initially portrayed as a "bad boy" type character although he later mellowed. His more notable storylines including a Gambling addiction which led him to lose his share in The Dog in the Pond, be disowned by his father and have his family turn there backs on him. Other storylines include helping his father to fake his own death and relentless schemes to regain the Dog in The Pond. In his time with the show he has also been at the centre of several relationships and affairs, one of which led him to become a father to twins. Various critics have praised his "bad boy" status. Others have criticised his "pimp-like dress sense" and accused him of being a "rat". Dawson has been nominated for several awards for his portrayal of Darren in his duration on the serial.

Mandy Richardson
 
Mandy Richardson (previously Hutchinson) is a fictional character from the British Channel 4 soap opera Hollyoaks, played by Sarah Jayne Dunn. She debuted on-screen during October 1996 and has been involved in such storylines including dealing with sexual abuse while she was a child by her father Dennis (David McAllister), numerous failed relationships, and the death of daughter Grace to Sudden Infant Death Syndrome. Mandy is the longest featured female character in the series. Dunn left the series in 2006, making brief returns in 2007 and 2008. She returned again in 2010 in a storyline which also saw the return of Warren Fox (Jamie Lomas).

References

External links

1995-1996
, Hollyoaks
, Hollyoaks